Monastery of St. Michael may refer to:

Albania
 St. Michael's Monastery Church, Nivan

Germany
 Monastery of St. Michael (Heidelberg)
 Rogate Monastery St. Michael

Italy
 Monastery of St. Michael (Murano)

Ukraine
 St. Michael's Golden-Domed Monastery

United Kingdom
Belmont Abbey, Herefordshire

See also
 Cathedral of Saint Michael (disambiguation)
 Michaelion
 Saint Michael (disambiguation)
 St. Michael's Church (disambiguation)